Asclepias erosa is a species of milkweed known commonly as desert milkweed. It is native to southern California, Arizona, and northern Baja California, where it is most abundant in the desert regions.

Description
This milkweed, Asclepias erosa, is a perennial herb with erect yellow-green stems and foliage in shades of pale whitish-green to dark green with white veining. It may be hairless to very fuzzy. The sturdy, pointed leaves grow opposite on the stout stem. Atop the stem is a rounded umbel of yellowish or cream-colored flowers. Each flower has thick, reflexed corollas beneath a flower center composed of rounded, horned filaments.

Uses
The plant is filled with a viscous sap that was roasted to a solid and enjoyed as a sort of chewing gum by local Native American groups. Researchers in Bard, California tested the plant as a potential source of natural rubber in 1935.

Butterflies
Asclepias erosa is a specific monarch butterfly food and habitat plant.

References

External links

Jepson Manual Treatment: Asclepias erosa
Ethnobotany: Asclepias erosa
Asclepias erosa Photo gallery

erosa
Butterfly food plants
Flora of California
Flora of Arizona
Flora of Baja California
Flora of the Sonoran Deserts
Flora of the California desert regions
Natural history of the Colorado Desert
Natural history of the Mojave Desert
Natural history of the California chaparral and woodlands
Natural history of the Peninsular Ranges
Natural history of the Santa Monica Mountains
Natural history of the Transverse Ranges
Rubber
Flora without expected TNC conservation status